Syria competed at the 2001 Mediterranean Games in Tunis, Tunisia. The medal tally was 9.

Medals by sport

Medalists

See also
 Syria at the 2005 Mediterranean Games

References
 2001 Mediterranean Games Official Results

Nations at the 2001 Mediterranean Games
2001
Mediterranean Games